The 1971 Individual Ice Speedway World Championship was the sixth edition of the World Championship.

The winner was Gabdrakhman Kadyrov of the Soviet Union for the fourth time.

Final 
 March 6–7
  Inzell

References

Ice speedway competitions
Ice